Morrow County is one of the 36 counties in the U.S. state of Oregon. As of the 2020 census, the population was 12,186. The county seat is Heppner. The county is named for one of its first settlers, Jackson L. Morrow, who was a member of the state legislature when the county was created. Half of the Umatilla Chemical Depot, which includes the Umatilla Chemical Agent Disposal Facility, and the Naval Weapons Systems Training Facility Boardman are located within the county. Morrow County is part of the Pendleton-Hermiston, OR, Micropolitan Statistical Area. It is located on the south side of the Columbia River and is included in the eight-county definition of Eastern Oregon.

History
Morrow County was created in 1885 from the western portion of Umatilla County and a small portion of eastern Wasco County. It is named for Jackson L. Morrow, a state representative who advocated for the county's formation. Heppner was designated the temporary county seat at the time the county was created and narrowly defeated Lexington in the election held in 1887 to determine the permanent county seat.

Geography

Morrow county is located in the eastern portion of Oregon, bounded by the counties of Grant, Gilliam and Umatilla. The county's northern border is defined by the Columbia River. Most of the county is dry and flat, but the southern county contains a section of the Blue Mountains, making it fairly mountainous. The highest point in the county is Black Mountain in Umatilla National Forest at 5923 ft (1808m). Rivers flowing from the mountains into the Colombia River. 

Adjacent counties
 Gilliam County - west
 Wheeler County - southwest
 Grant County - south
 Umatilla County - east
 Benton County, Washington - north
 Klickitat County, Washington - northwest

National protected areas
Umatilla National Forest (part)
Umatilla National Wildlife Refuge (part)

Demographics

2000 census
As of the census of 2000, there were 10,995 people, 3,776 households, and 2,718 families living in the county.  The population density was 5 people per square mile (2/km2).  There were 4,296 housing units at an average density of 2 per square mile (1/km2).  The racial makeup of the county was 76.27% White, 0.14% Black or African American, 1.42% Native American, 0.45% Asian, 0.08% Pacific Islander, 19.54% from other races, and 2.14% from two or more races.  24.43% of the population were Hispanic or Latino of any race. 13.6% were of German, 12.8% American, 8.3% Irish, and 8.0% English ancestry. 77.3% spoke English and 22.3% Spanish as their first language.

There were 3,776 households, out of which 38.91% had children under the age of 18 living with them, 62.60% were married couples living together, 8.87% had a female householder with no husband present, and 22.70% were non-families. 18.13% of all households were made up of individuals, and 7.40% had someone living alone who was 65 years of age or older.  The average household size was 2.90 and the average family size was 3.28.

In the county, the population was spread out, with 30.80% under the age of 18, 8.90% from 18 to 24, 27.30% from 25 to 44, 22.40% from 45 to 64, and 10.60% who were 65 years of age or older.  The median age was 33 years. For every 100 females, there were 106.50 males.  For every 100 females age 18 and over, there were 106.10 males.

The median income for a household in the county was $37,525, and the median income for a family was $40,731. Males had a median income of $32,328 versus $22,887 for females. The per capita income for the county was $15,843.  14.80% of the population and 11.30% of families were below the poverty line.  Out of the total population, 21.60% of those under the age of 18 and 10.1% of those 65 and older were living below the poverty line.

2010 census
As of the 2010 census, there were 11,173 people, 3,916 households, and 2,953 families living in the county. The racial makeup of the county was 77.7% white, 1.2% American Indian, 0.9% Asian, 0.5% black or African American, 0.1% Pacific islander, 16.9% from other races, and 2.6% from two or more races. Those of Hispanic or Latino origin made up 31.3% of the population. In terms of ancestry, 19.5% were German, 13.1% were English, 10.7% were Irish, and 5.0% were American.

Of the 3,916 households, 37.7% had children under the age of 18 living with them, 59.7% were married couples living together, 9.6% had a female householder with no husband present, 24.6% were non-families, and 19.1% of all households were made up of individuals. The average household size was 2.85 and the average family size was 3.25. The median age was 36.5 years.

The median income for a household in the county was $43,902 and the median income for a family was $49,868. Males had a median income of $38,045 versus $30,173 for females. The per capita income for the county was $20,201. About 12.4% of families and 15.3% of the population were below the poverty line, including 21.7% of those under age 18 and 3.9% of those age 65 or over.

Politics
Like all counties in eastern Oregon, the majority of registered voters who are part of a political party in Morrow County are members of the Republican Party. No Democratic presidential nominee has won a clear majority in Morrow County since Lyndon Johnson in 1964, though Jimmy Carter and Bill Clinton both won pluralities here in 1976 and 1996, respectively (and just 13 votes shy of voting Democratic in 1992). In the 2008 presidential election 61.94% of Morrow County voters voted for Republican John McCain, while 34.62% voted for Democrat Barack Obama and 3.44% of voters either voted for a third-party candidate or wrote in a candidate. These numbers show a slight shift towards the Democratic candidate when compared to the 2004 presidential election, in which 65.9% of Morrow Country voters voted for George W. Bush, while 32.8% voted for John Kerry, and 1.4% of voters either voted for a third-party candidate or wrote in a candidate. However, it shifted back in 2012 and 2016, with Mitt Romney and Donald Trump both receiving roughly 65% of the vote.

Economy
The principal industries in the county today include agriculture, food processing, lumber, livestock, and recreation. The Columbia River also provides Morrow County with a number of related jobs. The Port of Morrow, situated on the Columbia River near the city of Boardman, was established in 1957.

Early cattlemen found an abundance of rye along the creek bottoms of the region and drove their herds into the area to forage on these natural pastures. Ranching was the primary economic force in the county for many years. Increased settlement, the enclosure of the free grazing lands and diminished pastures due to overgrazing, resulted in the decline of ranching during the 19th century, and farming became predominant. The completion of rail lines into the county in 1883 increased access to markets and encouraged wheat production in the area. The advent of technology for center pivot irrigation has been a further stimulus to the local economy.

Two natural gas-fired plants are located at the Port of Morrow; Coyote Springs I (255-276 MW), owned and operated by Portland General Electric; and Coyote Springs II (241-280 MW; PGE operator) owned by Avista Corp.

In 2022, it was reported that Amazon intends to build at least five commercial data centers in Morrow County. The company is reportedly pursuing a package of tax breaks to pursue construction of these centers, a project worth almost $12 billion total.

Transportation

Airports
 Boardman Airport
 Lexington Airport

Major roads
  Interstate 84
  U.S. Route 30
  U.S. Route 730
  Oregon Route 74
  Oregon Route 206
  Oregon Route 207

Communities

Cities
Boardman
Heppner (county seat)
Ione
Irrigon
Lexington

Unincorporated communities

Castle Rock (former post office)
Cecil
Clarke
Eightmile
Ella
Gooseberry
Lena
Morgan
Pine City
Ruggs
Valby

Ghost town
Hardman, Oregon

See also
National Register of Historic Places listings in Morrow County, Oregon

References

External links
 Morrow County
 Morrow County Parks
 Morrow County History from the Oregon State Archives

 
1885 establishments in Oregon
Populated places established in 1885
Pendleton–Hermiston Micropolitan Statistical Area